Franklin is a city in and county seat of Williamson County, Tennessee, United States. As of 2020, its population was 83,454. It is the seventh-largest city in Tennessee. Franklin is known to be the home of many celebrities, mostly country music stars.

The city developed on both sides of the Harpeth River, a tributary of the Cumberland River. In the 19th century, Franklin (as the county seat) was the trading and judicial center for primarily rural Williamson County and remained so well into the 20th century as the county remained rural and agricultural in nature.

Since 1980, areas of northern Franklin have been developed for residential and related businesses, in addition to modern service industries. The population has increased rapidly as growth moved in all directions from the core. Despite recent growth and development, Franklin is noted for its many older buildings and neighborhoods, which are protected by city ordinances.

History

18th century
The City of Franklin was founded October 26, 1799, by Abram Maury Jr. (1766–1825). Later a state senator, he is buried with his family in the current Founders Pointe neighborhood. Maury named the town after national founding father Benjamin Franklin.

Ewen Cameron built a log house in 1798, the first in the new settlement. Cameron was born February 23, 1768, in Bogallan, Ferintosh, Scotland. He emigrated to Virginia in 1785 and came to Tennessee shortly after it was admitted to the Union.  Cameron died on February 28, 1846, after living 48 years in the same house. He and his second wife, Mary, were buried in the old City Cemetery. Some of his descendants continue to live in Franklin.

19th century
This area is part of Middle Tennessee, and farmers prospered in the pre-Civil War years, with the cultivation of tobacco and hemp as commodity crops, and raising of livestock.

During the Civil War, Tennessee was occupied by Union troops from 1862. Franklin was the site of a major battle in the Franklin–Nashville Campaign. The Second Battle of Franklin was fought on November 30, 1864, resulting in almost 10,000 casualties (killed, wounded, captured, and missing). Forty-four buildings were temporarily converted to use as field hospitals. The Carter, Carnton, and the Lotz houses from this era are still standing and are among the city's numerous examples of period architecture.

On July 6, 1867, a political rally of Union League Black Republicans in Franklin was disrupted by Conservatives, who were mostly White but included some Blacks. Later that evening, what became known as the "Franklin Riot" broke out. Black Union League men were ambushed by Whites at the town square and returned fire. An estimated 25 to 39 men were wounded, most of them Black. One White man was killed outright, and at least three Black people died of wounds soon after the confrontation.

On August 15, 1868, in Franklin, Samuel Bierfield became the first Jewish man to be lynched in the United States. He was fatally shot by a large group of masked men believed to be KKK members. They attacked him for treating Blacks equally to Whites in his store. Bowman, a Black man who worked for Bierfield and was with him at his store, was wounded in the attack and soon died.

After the Reconstruction era, violence continued against African Americans, rising toward the turn of the century. Five African Americans were lynched in Williamson County from 1877 to 1950, most during the decades around the turn of the century, a time of high social tensions and legal racial oppression in the South. These murders took place in Franklin, when men were taken from the courthouse or county jail before trial. Among them was Amos Miller, a 23-year-old Black man who was forcibly taken from the courtroom by a White mob during his 1888 trial in a sexual assault case, and hanged from the railings of the balcony of the county courthouse. The alleged victim was a 50-year-old woman. On April 30, 1891, Jim Taylor, another African American man, was lynched on Murfreesboro Road in Franklin by another mob, accused of killing a White man.

A memorial to Confederate soldiers was erected in 1899 by fourteen women of the United Daughters of the Confederacy to honor Confederate soldiers, including the 6,125 casualties of the Battle of Franklin. A news report described how as the last piece of the statue was being raised, a buggy ran into a rope, causing the statue to swing into the shaft, breaking out a piece from the hat of the figure. This event has given rise to the monument's nickname by many of "Chip."

20th century to present
Population growth slowed noticeably from 1910 to 1940 (see table in Demographics section), as many African Americans left the area in the Great Migration to northern industrial cities for jobs and to escape Jim Crow conditions.

One of the first major manufacturers to establish operations in the county was the Dortch Stove Works, which opened a factory in Franklin in 1928. The factory was later developed as a Magic Chef factory, producing electric and gas ranges. (Magic Chef was prominent in the Midwest from 1929.) When the factory was closed due to extensive restructuring in the industry, the structure fell into disuse. The factory complex was restored in the late 1990s in an adaptation for offices, restaurants, retail and event spaces. It is considered a "model historic preservation adaptive reuse project."

Since the late 20th century, however, Franklin has rapidly developed as a suburb of Nashville, Tennessee. Franklin's population has increased more than fivefold since 1980, when its population was 12,407. In 2010, the city had a population of 62,487.  Census estimates, it is the state's seventh-largest city. In 2017, the City of Franklin was ranked the 8th fastest-growing city in the nation by the U.S. Census Bureau, increasing 4.9 percent between July 1, 2016, and July 1, 2017.

The regional economy has also expanded, with considerable growth in businesses and jobs in Franklin and Williamson County.

After the passage of the National Historic Preservation Act of 1966, some Franklin residents have worked to identify and preserve its most significant historic assets. Five historic districts are listed on the National Register of Historic Places, as are many individual non-historic but older structures.

Franklin is home to an armed forces memorial, on the grounds of the Williamson County Archives, which honors Williamson County servicemen who served in American wars from the Creek War to the Gulf War. Around the seal of Franklin are placed engraved bricks that radiate around it in a circle. The largest brick is in honor of George Jordan, a former slave who fought in the Indian Wars in New Mexico, and the only Williamson Countian to receive the Congressional Medal of Honor.

As part of the "Fuller Story," a plan developed by historic preservation and church leaders to recognize the lives and contributions of African Americans to Franklin, a statue of a soldier of the United States Colored Troops, to mark the contributions of African Americans in ending the Civil War and reuniting the Union, has been placed in front of the old Williamson County Courthouse on the Franklin Square, the site of a former slave market and the current "Chip" statue. This project was approved by the Franklin Board Of Mayor and Aldermen. In 2018, the first of several planned historic plaques was installed; these mark the history of slavery, the Reconstruction era and Jim Crow, and civil rights.

Geography

Climate

Demographics

Since the late 20th century, the city has grown rapidly in population, attracting many businesses.

2020 census

As of the 2020 United States census, there were 83,454 people, 32,690 households, and 23,675 families residing in the city.

2010 census
As of the census of 2010, 62,487 people, 16,128 households, and 11,225 families resided in the city. The population density was 1,393.3 people per square mile (538.0/km2). The 17,296 housing units averaged 575.9 per square mile (222.4/km2). The racial makeup of the city was 84.53% White, 10.35% African American, 4.84% Latino, 1.61% Asian, 0.24% Native American, 0.05% Pacific Islander, 2.17% from other races, and 1.06% from two or more races.

Of the 16,128 households, 38.6% had children under the age of 18 living with them, 56.2% were married couples living together, 10.8% had a female householder with no husband present, and 30.4% were not families; 25.0% of all households were made up of individuals, and 5.4% had someone living alone who was 65 years of age or older. The average household size was 2.55 and the average family size was 3.09.
In the city, the population was distributed as 27.9% under the age of 18, 7.5% from 18 to 24, 38.1% from 25 to 44, 19.2% from 45 to 64, and 7.4% who were 65 years of age or older. The median age was 33 years. For every 100 females, there were 93.6 males. For every 100 females age 18 and over, there were 90.2 males.

The median income for a household in the CDP was $75,871, and for a family was $91,931. Males had a median income of $66,622 versus $43,193 for females. The per capita income for the CDP was $36,445. About 5.0% of families and 7.0% of the population were below the poverty line, including 9.2% of those under age 18 and 6.9% of those age 65 or over. Less than 5.0% of the eligible workforce was unemployed.

Economy
Franklin is home to health-care-related businesses such as Community Health Systems, Acadia Healthcare, Iasis Healthcare, Tivity Health, Home Instead Senior Care, MedSolutions Inc, and Renal Advantage Inc. In addition, Nissan, Mitsubishi Motors,  Clarcor, CKE Restaurants, Jackson National Life, Triangle Tyre Company, Provident Music Group, World Christian Broadcasting, Mars Petcare, Franklin American Mortgage, Kaiser Aluminum, Lee Company, Ramsey Solutions, Video Gaming Technologies, and Atmos Energy also have corporate or regional headquarters in Franklin.

Top employers
According to the city's 2020 Comprehensive Annual Financial Report, the top employers in the city are:

Government

The city is run by a mayor, elected at-large in the city, and a board of eight aldermen. Four of the latter are elected from single-member districts of roughly equal population, and four are elected at-large.  All electoral offices are for four-year terms, with the ward alderman elected in one cycle, and the mayor and at-large aldermen elected two years later. The city's policies and procedures are decided by the Board of Mayor and Aldermen.

Resolutions, municipal ordinances, and the municipal code are carried out by the city's various departments. These are: Administration, Building and Neighborhood Services, Engineering, Finance, Fire, Human Resources, Information Technology, Law, Planning and Sustainability, Parks, Police, Sanitation and Environmental Services, Streets, and Water Management. These 14 departments are overseen by the City Administrator, a professional manager hired by the Board of Aldermen.

In the Tennessee House of Representatives, Franklin is divided between three districts; District 61, currently represented by Republican Brandon Ogles, District 63, represented by Republican Glen Casada, and District 65, represented by Republican Sam Whitson. Franklin is included in Tennessee Senate District 23, which is coterminous with Williamson County, and held by Republican Jack Johnson, the current Senate Majority Leader.

Education

Public schools
Most of the city is served by the Williamson County School District for K-8 and the Franklin Special School District for high school. Outerlying portions of the city are in the Williamson County district for grades K-12.

Private schools
Franklin's private schools include Battle Ground Academy, Franklin Classical School, Franklin Christian Academy, Montessori School of Franklin, and New Hope Academy.

Higher education
 Belmont University, Williamson Center campus. 
 Columbia State Community College, Franklin campus. This satellite campus of Columbia State was opened in 2016 after being constructed for this purpose. It is a two-year college, serving a nine-county area in Middle Tennessee. 
 Lipscomb University, a SPARK satellite campus, is here.
 New College Franklin
 Williamson College

Infrastructure

Transportation
Interstate 65 passes through the eastern part of the city and provides four exits in the city. U.S. Routes 31 and 431 intersect in the city, and form a concurrency, connecting the city to Nashville to the north. U.S. Route 31 connects the city to Spring Hill and Columbia to the south, and US 431 connects to Lewisburg to the south. State Route 96 connects the city to Murfreesboro to the east, and Dickson to the west. State Route 246 also connects the city to Columbia to the southwest, and serves as an alternative to US 31. State Route 441 begins in the northern part of the city, and connects to Brentwood. State Route 397, also designated as US 31/431 Truck and Mack Hatcher Memorial Parkway, serves as a bypass around the business district of the city to the east. Other major thoroughfares in Franklin include Cool Springs Boulevard and McEwen Drive, both of which have interchanges with I-65.

Utilities
The City of Franklin Water Management Department operates a system that provides water and wastewater services to a majority of city residents and some residents of surrounding areas.  Some areas of Franklin may receive water and wastewater services from the Mallory Valley Utility District, the Milcrofton Utility District, and the HB&TS Utility District.

Electricity is provided by the Middle Tennessee Electric Membership Corporation (MTEMC), which serves several of the suburban counties of Nashville and purchases power from the Tennessee Valley Authority (TVA).

Natural gas service is provided by Atmos Energy.

Parks

 Pinkerton Park 
 Fort Granger 
 Aspen Grove Park
 Bicentennial Park
 Carter's Hill Park
 Collins Farm
 Del Rio Park
 Eastern Flank Battlefield Park
 Fieldstone Park
 The Park at Harlinsdale Farm
 Jim Warren Park
 Liberty Park
 Winstead Hill
 New Southeastern Park Complex

Festivals

Pilgrimage Music and Cultural Festival
Pilgrimage is a music festival put together by Kevin Griffin, who lives and works as a musician in Franklin. Premiering in 2015, it draws nationally prominent acts from a variety of genres.  Pilgrimage is held in late September and takes place at The Park at Harlinsdale. In addition to musical acts, it features children's activities, food, and a marketplace showcasing local crafts.

Main Street Festival
Franklin's Main Street Festival involves artisans, four stages, two carnivals, and two food courts installed in the historic Franklin Square and Downtown District. Arts and crafts booths run from First to Fifth Avenue.

Pumpkinfest
Pumpkinfest is an annual fundraiser for the Heritage Foundation of Franklin and Williamson County, held on the Saturday before Halloween. The holiday theme is carried through activities including music, children's amusements, local artisans, and food.

Dickens of a Christmas
Dickens of a Christmas is celebrated every second week in December, attracting approximately 50,000 visitors yearly. It takes place in Historic Downtown Franklin. Costumed volunteers masquerade as figures from Charles Dickens' A Christmas Carol. Music and dancing are a big part of the festival, and local school and church musical groups often perform. Victorian cuisine is served to visitors, and an arts and crafts bazaar features prominently in Public Square.

Notable people

 Luke Bryan, country music star
Carrie Underwood, country music star
Brad Paisley, country music star
 Tim McGraw, country music star
 Faith Hill, country music star
 Justin Timberlake, singer
 Miley Cyrus, singer-songwriter and actress
 Chris Stapleton, country music star
 Reese Witherspoon, actress
 Oprah Winfrey, media personality
 Kane Brown, country music star
 Keith Urban, country music star
 Nicole Kidman, actress
 Wynonna Judd, country music star
 Kenny Chesney, country music star
 Martina McBride, country music star
 Vince Gill, country music star
 Billy Ray Cyrus, singer
 Kristin Cavallari, TV personality
 Mike Fisher (ice hockey), former NHL player
 Ashley Judd, actress
 Kimberly Williams-Paisley, actress
 Amy Grant, singer
 C. J. Beathard, NFL quarterback
 Luke Benward, actor/singer
 Duane Eddy, musician 
 David A. French, journalist and lawyer
 Kathie Lee Gifford, TV personality and singer
 Tony Kemp, baseball player
 Robert Knight, musician
 Bill Lee, 50th governor of Tennessee
 David Meece, contemporary Christian singer, musician and songwriter whose best-known song is "We Are the Reason"
 Dustin Ortiz, former UFC mixed martial artist
 Paramore, rock band
 Tommee Profitt, musician
 Andrew Puzder, businessman and President Donald Trump's Secretary of Labor choice
 Dave Ramsey, TV/radio personality and financial advisor
 Allen Shamblin, country music songwriter ("The House That Built Me" and others)
 Brandt Snedeker, PGA golfer
Chris Tomlin, Christian musician
 Cal Turner Jr., billionaire heir, former CEO of Dollar General
 Hayley Williams, musician
 Ben Zobrist, baseball player
Julianna Zobrist, musician

In popular culture
The 1986 Orion Pictures movie At Close Range, starring Sean Penn, Christopher Walken, and Keifer Sutherland, was filmed in downtown Franklin.
The ABC television show Nashville (2012) filmed many concert show segments at the Franklin Theatre.
 Canadian singer Justin Bieber filmed the 2011 video for his song "Mistletoe" in Downtown Franklin.
 The 2015 Town Square Pictures movie The Secret Handshake, starring Kevin Sorbo, Amy Grant, and Mark Collie, was filmed in Franklin's Cottonwood subdivision.
The 2017 EchoLight Studios movie Sweet Sweet Summertime, starring David DeLuise, Markie Post, and Jaci Velasquez, was filmed in Franklin.

Sister cities
Franklin is an active participant in the Sister Cities program. Sister Cities of Franklin & Williamson County was founded as an outgrowth of Leadership Franklin in March 2002. The City of Franklin has relationships with the following municipalities:

 Carleton Place, Ontario, Canada (2008)
 County Laois, Ireland (2008)
 Bad Soden am Taunus, Hesse, Germany (2016)

See also

Tennessee and Alabama Railroad Freight Depot

References

External links

 City of Franklin (official website)
 City charter
 Franklin: 2009 Dozen Distinctive Destinations, National Trust for Historic Preservation
 The Battle of Franklin, Tennessee by John K. Shellenberger
 

 
Cities in Tennessee
Cities in Williamson County, Tennessee
Cities in Nashville metropolitan area
Populated places established in 1799
County seats in Tennessee
1799 establishments in Tennessee